(Voice of Gwynedd) is a small regionalist political party based in Gwynedd in North Wales. The party formed following the Plaid Cymru executive's proposal to more than halve the number of primary schools in Gwynedd by closing rural schools. Many of the party's members are former members of Plaid.

Electoral history
The party won twelve seats on Gwynedd Council in the 2008 UK Local Elections, ending overall control of the council by Plaid Cymru. They won seven seats in Dwyfor, three in Meirionnydd and two in Arfon. Llais Gwynedd won another seat in Blaenau Ffestiniog in June (the poll had been postponed due to the death of the Labour candidate) giving them a total of 13 seats on Gwynedd Council. They declined to form a coalition with Plaid. They tried to gain the post of chair of the Children and Young Persons Committee, but Labour councillors voted with Plaid.

Gwilym Euros Roberts, a Llais Gwynedd councillor, was due to stand against the National Assembly of Wales presiding officer Lord Dafydd Elis-Thomas in 2011 in the Welsh Assembly constituency of Dwyfor Meirionnydd. However, in July 2010 Roberts was jailed for four and a half years at Caernarfon Crown Court for wounding his wife with intent; he had stood down from his post that May.

Llais Gwynedd held the Diffwys and Maenofferen ward in the by-election on 15 July 2010. Their candidate Richard Owen Lloyd Jones won by 185 votes to 181 for Plaid. Llais Gwynedd gained a further council seat at the Seiont by-election on 7 October 2010.

In the 2011 National Assembly for Wales election, the party fielded Louise Hughes as their candidate in Dwyfor Meirionnydd. She received 3,225 votes or 15.5% of the vote, taking most of her support from the Plaid Cymru candidate.

In 2011, despite moderate success in the National Assembly Elections in Dwyfor Meirionnydd, Llais Gwynedd failed to produce a candidate for Arfon. They also lost the second Diffwys and Maenofferen by-election to Plaid Cymru, and failed to field candidates in other by-elections, which allowed their main rivals, Plaid Cymru, to regain their majority on Gwynedd County Council. In February 2012, Councillor Chris Hughes (who had beaten Dafydd Iwan in the 2008 local government elections) left the Llais Gwynedd group and joined Plaid Cymru.

In the May 2012 council elections, Llais Gwynedd returned 13 councillors on Gwynedd Council and held the balance of power in the council chamber. The defection of three Llais Gwynedd councillors from Dwyfor to Plaid Cymru in May 2015 returned control to Plaid Cymru.

Electoral performance

Senedd elections

Policies

According to the party's online manifesto their key policies are:
Gwynedd has particular needs which were not being met by the Plaid Cymru governing council of Gwynedd
Stop school closures unless there is a consensus within a particular locality in support of such a measure.
Stop local people being sent for specialist care out of Gwynedd
Opposes the North West Wales Spatial Development Strategy which focused most investment in Gwynedd on the Menai coastal strip
Supports tourism, but is opposed to the sort of tourism which has a negative impact on "Gwynedd's unique social, linguistic and cultural fabric"
Create local employment to stop young people leaving Gwynedd to look for work elsewhere
In favour of removing restrictions on housing developments to allow local people to build on their own land
Enthusiastically supports the Welsh language
Proposes extra measures to protect Welsh-speaking rural communities in Gwynedd

References

External links
 Llais Gwynedd Manifesto

2008 establishments in Wales
Political parties established in 2008
Political parties in Wales
Regionalist parties in the United Kingdom
Locally based political parties in Wales